Emek HaMa'ayanot Regional Council (Mo'atza Azorit Emek HaMa'ayanot, lit. Valley of the Springs Regional Council) is a regional council in the Northern District of Israel that encompasses most of the settlements in the Beit She'an Valley. Until 2008 it was known as the Beit She'an Valley Regional Council (Mo'atza Azorit Bik'at Beit She'an).

Physical geography
The territory of the regional council is bounded by the Jezreel Valley in the west, in the north by the Lower Galilee, to the east by the Jordan River, and the south by the Jordan Valley and Samarian hills.

Population and administrative geography
About 12,000 people live in the sixteen kibbutzim, six moshavim, and 2 community villages located in its municipal territory. The city of Beit She'an lies in the centre of the territory, but is an independent municipality.

List of settlements

Kibbutzim

Ein HaNetziv
Gesher
Hamadia
Kfar Ruppin

Ma'ale Gilboa
Maoz Haim
Meirav
Mesilot

Neve Eitan
Neve Ur
Nir David
Reshafim

Sde Eliyahu
Sde Nahum
Shluhot
Tirat Zvi

Moshavim

Beit Yosef
Rehov
Revaya
Sde Trumot
Yardena

Other

Malkishua (drug rehabilitation centre)
Menahemia (moshava)
Tel Te'omim (community settlement)

See also
Tourism in Israel

References

External links
 Official website (in Hebrew)

 
Regional councils in Northern District (Israel)